The General Instrument/Motorola DCT2000 is a cable box used for watching TV. These set-top boxes were popular in the late 1990s up until the mid to late-2000s, when the adoption of more sophisticated successors, namely those set-tops with the ability to record live programming began. The DCT2000 was used by Comcast, Service Electric in the United States, and Shaw Cable in Canada. A version called the QIP2500 is used by providers such as Verizon FiOS.

Features 
The unit features coaxial connections for connecting it to the cable company's signal and to the user's TV or VCR. There are also composite (and, in some models, S-Video) connections for a high-quality connection to a TV or VCR. In order to provide 2-way communication (e.g. ordering PPV from the remote), the unit can feature an integrated RF return or a STARFONE option which uses the telephone landline to connect.

References

DCT2000
Set-top box